Archery is the art, sport, practice or skill of using a bow to shoot arrows.

Archery may also refer to:
Archery, Georgia, an unincorporated community, United States
Archery (album), a 1982 album by John Zorn

See also
 Archer (disambiguation)